Pierre Baudeau (1643–1708) was a surgeon-major in New France where he arrived in 1692, replacing Michel Sarrazin in that position.

It is known from the writings of Governor Frontenac that Baudeau was highly regarded by him. He was active at the Hôtel-Dieu de Québec during his service in New France.

References

External links 
 Biography at the Dictionary of Canadian Biography Online

1643 births
1708 deaths
17th-century Canadian physicians
People of New France